The Strathcona Islands are uninhabited Canadian arctic islands located in Hudson Strait, Nunavut, Canada. There are also several small, rocky islands.

Kimmirut, an Inuit hamlet, is to the east.

References

Archipelagoes of Baffin Island
Archipelagoes of the Canadian Arctic Archipelago
Islands of Hudson Strait
Uninhabited islands of Qikiqtaaluk Region